Geulat Israel was a short-lived Haredi political party in Israel in the early 1990s.

Background
The party was established on 25 December 1990 when Eliezer Mizrahi broke away from Agudat Yisrael. Despite leaving the party, Mizrahi remained Deputy Minister of Health.

The party participated in the  1992 elections, where it won 12,851 votes (0.5%). However, this was not enough to cross the electoral threshold of 1.5% and Mizrahi lost his seat. The party subsequently disappeared

Leaders

Election results

References

External links
Geulat Yisrael Knesset website

Defunct political parties in Israel
Orthodox Jewish political parties
Political parties established in 1990
1990 establishments in Israel
Political parties disestablished in the 1990s
1990s disestablishments in Israel